Baltistan Wildlife Sanctuary is a wildlife sanctuary covering an area of  in the Baltistan region of northern Pakistan.  Contiguous with the Astore Wildlife Sanctuary to its south and east, the Baltistan Wildlife Sanctuary lies south of the Indus River, between the villages of Rondu and Shengus, in the Skardu District.  This protected area was established in 1975, for the purpose of conserving the threatened species that occupy the park, and among them there are snow leopard, brown bear, lynx, Tibetan wolf, Tibetan sand fox, markhor, bharal, and Siberian ibex.

References

Baltistan
Nature reserves in Pakistan
Wildlife sanctuaries of Pakistan
Protected areas of Gilgit-Baltistan